Takaka is a dene in northeastern Afghanistan. It is located in Khwahan District, Badakhshan Province.

See also
Badakhshan Province

References

External links
Satellite map at Maplandia.com

Populated places in Khwahan District